Marshall Wright may refer to:

Marshall Wright (diplomat) (1926–2013), American politician
Marshall Wright (historian), American historian
Marshall Wright (politician) (born 1976), American lawyer